A list of films produced by the Marathi language film industry based in Maharashtra in the year 1959.

1959 Releases
A list of Marathi films released in 1959.

References

Lists of 1959 films by country or language
 Marathi
1959